"Long Live Walter Jameson" is episode 24 of the American television anthology series The Twilight Zone.

Opening narration

The narration continues after the camera cuts to an elderly man seated among the students during Jameson's lecture.

Plot
Walter Jameson, a college professor, is engaged to a young doctoral student named Susanna Kittridge. Susanna's father, Sam Kittridge, another professor at Jameson's college, becomes suspicious of Jameson because he does not appear to have aged in the twelve years they have known each other and seems to have unrealistically detailed knowledge of some pieces of history that do not appear in texts. Jameson at one point reads from an original Civil War diary in his possession. Later, Kittridge recognizes Jameson in a Mathew Brady Civil War photograph.

After Kittridge presents these pieces of evidence, Jameson ultimately reveals his real life history. Agelessness (but no immunity to injury) was imparted to him by an alchemist more than 2,000 years ago. Jameson does not know what was done to him, only that the alchemist was gone when he recovered, and he then stopped aging. Soon, he had to become a constant refugee. He tells Kittridge that he learned a terrible lesson from living for so long and longs for death. He keeps a revolver in his desk drawer, but does not have the courage to use it.

Realizing that if Jameson marries his daughter, she will grow old, and Jameson will eventually abandon her in order to keep his secret, Kittridge refuses permission for Jameson to marry his daughter. Jameson defies him and proposes to Susanna, and they plan to immediately elope.

Jameson is accosted by Laurette Bowen, one of his wives, whom he abandoned when she grew old and frail. She claims that she cannot allow Jameson to destroy another woman's life. She discovers Jameson's pistol lying on his desk and shoots him. Shortly after Bowen leaves, Kittridge enters Jameson's study and finds him bleeding, but seemingly at peace. Jameson rapidly ages and collapses on the floor. Susanna enters the house. Kittridge tries to stop her from seeing the aged Jameson, saying only that he is gone. He is unable to keep her out of the room, but inside she discovers only an empty suit of clothes with a white substance near the collar and sleeves. When Susanna asks what is on the floor, the professor replies, "Dust, only dust."

Closing narration

Makeup effects
The scenes of Walter Jameson's aging was performed by using an old movie-making trick. Age lines were drawn on actor Kevin McCarthy's face in red make-up. During the beginning of the scene, red lighting was used, bathing the scene in red and hiding the age lines. As the scene progressed, the red lights were turned down and green lights were brought up. Under the green lights, the red age lines were prominent. The lighting changes were unseen by the audience because it was filmed in black-and-white. A subsequent episode, "Queen of the Nile", used a similar effect.

Home media
For the DVD release Kevin McCarthy returned to record an audio commentary for the episode, revealing that he never met Rod Serling and that, aside from Invasion of the Body Snatchers, his appearance in this episode generated the most fan mail he ever received.

See also 
 Immortality in fiction
 The Man from Earth

Further reading
Zicree, Marc Scott: The Twilight Zone Companion.  Sillman-James Press, 1982 (second edition).  .
DeVoe, Bill. (2008). Trivia from The Twilight Zone. Albany, GA: Bear Manor Media. 
Grams, Martin. (2008). The Twilight Zone: Unlocking the Door to a Television Classic. Churchville, MD: OTR Publishing.

External links
 

1960 American television episodes
Television episodes about death
The Twilight Zone (1959 TV series season 1) episodes
Television shows written by Charles Beaumont
Television episodes about immortality